Dale Wayne Atkeson (December 24, 1930 – May 10, 2007) was a former American football fullback in the National Football League for the Washington Redskins.  He did not attend college.

Atkeson was traded by the Redskins to the Pittsburgh Steelers following the 1956 season. However, he never played for the Steelers after suffering a torn Achilles tendon.

References

1930 births
2007 deaths
Players of American football from Kansas City, Missouri
Washington Redskins players
American football fullbacks